The e-Government Unit (eGU) was a unit of the Cabinet Office of the government of the United Kingdom responsible for helping various government departments use information technology to increase efficiency and improve electronic access to government services. It was therefore deeply involved in issues of e-Government.

The unit was created by Prime Minister Tony Blair in September 2004, replacing the Office of the e-Envoy. Its first head was Ian Watmore, who was succeeded in January 2006 by Andrew Stott.

The eGU website was closed down in 2007.

Mission

The eGU’s stated mission was to "ensur[e] that IT supports the business transformation of Government itself so that we can provide better, more efficient, public services."

The eGU was responsible for
 formulating information technology (IT) strategy and policy
 developing common IT components for use across government
 promoting best practices across government
 delivering citizen-centered online services

The eGU website listed six guiding principles for the unit:
 To work on public service projects, not just IT projects
 To add value and support, rather than control or dictate
 To undertake partnerships with departments and suppliers
 To set realistic expectations and aim to exceed them
 To promote global best practices
 To share solutions when possible, and offer flexibility to meet unique needs

Responsibilities

Responsibilities of the eGU included:
 Strategy – to develop policy and planning for Information and Communication Technology (ICT) within the Government and to provide an element of programme management; to support the Government's objectives for public service delivery and administrative efficiency.
 Architecture – to provide policy, design, standards, governance, advice and guidance for ICT in central government; to commission government-wide infrastructure and services; to address issues of systems integration with other levels of government.
 Innovation – to provide high-level advice to government bodies on innovative opportunities that come from ICT.
 IT Finance – to monitor major IT projects in the Government and give advice on major investment decisions, in partnership with the Office of Government Commerce (OGC).
 IT HR – to lead the Government’s professional IT development.
 Projects – to take on ad hoc policy and strategy studies to support ministers, the Prime Minister's Office, the Cabinet Office and the Treasury.
 Research – to identify and communicate key technology trends, opportunities, threats and risks.
 Security – to oversee government IT security policy, standards, monitoring and assurance, and contingency-planning for the critical national infrastructure.
 Supplier management – to manage the top-level relationship with strategic suppliers to the Government and to carry out supplier analysis, in partnership with OGC.

References

External links
 Archive of the e-Government Unit

Defunct public bodies of the United Kingdom
British Prime Minister's Office
E-government in the United Kingdom
Open government in the United Kingdom
Cabinet Office (United Kingdom)